Ernie Adams (born Ernest Stephen Dumarais; June 18, 1885 – November 26, 1947) was an American vaudevillian performer, stage and screen actor and writer.

Biography
Born in San Francisco, California to Leon D. Adams and Laurence G. Girard, he was also billed as Ernest S. Adams and Ernie S. Adams.

He appeared in vaudeville, theater, and film. He started his career in musical comedy on Broadway. Along with his wife Berdonna Gilbert, he formed the vaudeville team "Gilbert and Adams". He appeared in more than 400 films starting from the silent era between 1919 and 1948, and was particularly known for playing shady characters. On Broadway, Adams appeared in Toot-Toot! (1918).

On November 26, 1947, Adams died of an acute pulmonary edema at the West Olympic Sanitarium in Los Angeles, California, aged 62. He is buried in Valhalla Memorial Park in North Hollywood.

Selected filmography

 A Regular Girl (1919)
 The Show (1922)
 The Beloved Brute (1924)
 Curlytop (1924)
 The Thundering Herd (1925)
 Pony Express (1925)
 The Best People (1925)
 Where the Worst Begins (1925)
 Lord Jim (1925)
 The Blackbird (1926)
 The Jazz Girl (1926)
 The Valley of Bravery (1926)
 Hair-Trigger Baxter (1926)
 Pals in Paradise (1926)
 Jewels of Desire (1927)
 Melting Millions (1927)
 Nevada (1927)
 The Main Event (1927)
 The Gay Defender (1927)
 Stool Pigeon (1928)
 Forgotten Faces (1928)
 Tenth Avenue (1928)
 What a Night! (1928)
 A Woman's Way (1928)
 One Splendid Hour (1929)
 The Fighting Legion (1930)
 The Galloping Ghost (1931, Serial)
 Night Beat (1931)
Is There Justice? (1931)
 The Hurricane Express (1932)
 The Pride of the Legion (1932)
 The Shadow of the Eagle (1932)
 Breed of the Border (1933)
 West of Singapore (1933)
 Galloping Romeo (1933)
 Found Alive (1933)
 It Happened One Night (1934) as The Bag Thief (uncredited)
 We're Not Dressing (1934)
 Hell Bent for Love (1934)
 Men of the Night (1934)
 The Law of the Wild (1934)
 Badge of Honor (1934)
 The Prescott Kid (1934)
 The Miracle Rider (1935)
 Trails End (1935)
 My Man Godfrey (1936)
 Road Gang (1936)
 Two-Fisted Sheriff (1937)
 San Quentin (1937) as Fink
 The Painted Trail (1938)
 West of Cheyenne (1938)
 The Purple Vigilantes (1938)
 The Man from Sundown (1939)
 The Invisible Killer (1939)
 The Man with Nine Lives (1940)
 The Golden Trail (1940)
 Enemy Agent (1940)
 The Pinto Kid (1941)
 Cactus Makes Perfect (1942)
 The Lone Prairie (1942)
 Stand By All Networks (1942)
 The Pride of the Yankees (1942) as Miller Huggins
 Phony Express (1943)
 Murder, My Sweet (1944)
 Lake Placid Serenade (1944)
 Ghost Guns (1944)
 Louisiana Hayride (1944) 
 Arizona Whirlwind (1944)
 The Mysterious Mr. Valentine (1946)
 It's a Wonderful Life (1946) - Ed
 The Law Comes to Gunsight (1947)
 Son of Zorro (1947)
 Robin Hood of Monterey (1947)
 Trailing Danger (1947)
 Yankee Fakir (1947)

References

External links

1885 births
1947 deaths
American male silent film actors
Male actors from San Francisco
20th-century American male actors
American male film actors
American male stage actors
Male Western (genre) film actors